Danielle Doty (April 27, 1993) is an American beauty queen who was crowned Miss Teen USA 2011.

Career
Doty first started her pageant career in the National American Miss system where she won the title of Miss Texas in several age divisions. Doty won the Miss Texas Teen USA title on November 28, 2010, the first state titleholder from the Rio Grande Valley. She represented Texas; her win was Texas' second, following that of Christie Lee Woods in 1996.

As of 2011, she attended Texas Christian University and is a member of Delta Delta Delta sorority.

Doty served as a finals judge at the Miss USA 2015 pageant on July 12, 2015, in Baton Rouge, Louisiana.

Personal life 
On December 23, 2018, Doty announced that she was engaged to her long-term boyfriend, Dylan Fitzgerald.

In January 2019, she announced on her Instagram that she had melanoma, a form of skin cancer.

References

American beauty pageant winners
Miss Teen USA winners
Living people
1993 births
2011 beauty pageant contestants
21st-century Miss Teen USA delegates
People from Harlingen, Texas